Ödön Toldi (23 June 1893 – 26 January 1966) was a Hungarian swimmer. He competed in the men's 200 metre breaststroke event at the 1908 Summer Olympics.

References

External links
 

1893 births
1966 deaths
Hungarian male swimmers
Olympic swimmers of Hungary
Swimmers at the 1908 Summer Olympics
Swimmers from Budapest